Oscar Dose (29 March 1901 – 13 October 1988) was a Swedish diver. He competed in the men's 3 metre springboard event at the 1920 Summer Olympics.

References

External links
 

1901 births
1988 deaths
Swedish male divers
Olympic divers of Sweden
Divers at the 1920 Summer Olympics
Divers from Gothenburg
20th-century Swedish people